The 50th Annual American Music Awards were held on November 20, 2022, at the Microsoft Theater in Los Angeles, in recognition of the most popular artists, songs, and albums of 2022. Wayne Brady hosted the show, which aired live on ABC. It was made available for streaming a day later on Hulu.

Nominations were announced on October 13, 2022. Four new categories were introduced this year: Favorite Afrobeats Artist, Favorite K-pop Artist, Favorite Rock Song, and Favorite Rock Album. Bad Bunny led the nominations overall with eight while Beyoncé and Taylor Swift were the most-nominated female artists with six each. Imagine Dragons and Måneskin earned the most group nominations, with four each.

Swift won all six of her nominations, including Artist of the Year, and extended her record as the most-awarded artist in AMA history, with 40 wins overall. A special award, Song of Soul, was presented to Yola. Lionel Richie was honored with the Icon Award.

Background and broadcast 
On September 15, 2022, Dick Clark Productions (DCP) and ABC announced that the 50th American Music Awards (AMAS) would be held on November 20 at the Microsoft Theater in Los Angeles, with Jesse Collins executive-producing the show together with Dionne Harmon and Jeannae Rouzan-Clay, and Larry Klein as producer. Tickets for the show went on sale on October 7 via AXS.com. Nominations were revealed on October 13. The show aired live on ABC and was made available for streaming the day after on Hulu.

The ceremony recorded the lowest-ever viewership in the history of the awards, with an audience of 3.3 million. It earned a 0.6 demo rating, marking a significant drop compared to the previous year's 3.8 million audience and 1.0 rating.

Performances
Performers were announced on October 31 and November 14, 2022. D-Nice served as the house DJ. Yola, GloRilla, Dove Cameron, and Anitta made their AMAs performance debuts at the show. Pink performed twice: first as the show's opening act, and later to sing "Hopelessly Devoted to You" in tribute to the late Olivia Newton-John. As the recipient of the inaugural Song of Soul award, Yola performed her song "Break the Bough", from the 2022 film Elvis.  Stevie Wonder and Charlie Puth performed a special extended medley of select Lionel Richie songs in honor of the singer being the year's Icon Award recipient. They were eventually joined onstage by several other artists including Ari Lennox, Melissa Etheridge, Yola, and Smokey Robinson. Though Tems, WizKid, and Richie were originally announced as performers, they did not perform on the show.

On November 21, Chris Brown shared a video clip on Instagram of a rehearsal for a tribute performance he had originally prepared for the show in honor of the 40th anniversary of Michael Jackson's Thriller (1982). Brown revealed that it had been cancelled by the AMAS "for reasons unknown" the day before the show was set to air. In response, a spokesperson for DCP stated that the cancellation was due to "creative direction" and not any fault of Brown's. He would have been joined by Ciara for the performance.

Presenters 
Wayne Brady was announced as the show's host on October 24. The full list of presenters was announced via Twitter on November 18.
 Sheryl Lee Ralph – presented New Artist of the Year
 Meghan Trainor – presented Favorite Rock Artist
 Niecy Nash-Betts  – presented Favorite Country Duo or Group and introduced Anitta
 Kelly Rowland – presented Favorite Male R&B Artist
 Jimmie Allen and Brady – introduced Carrie Underwood; Allen performed a brief tribute to the late Loretta Lynn before introducing Underwood
 Karrueche Tran – presented Favorite Pop Album
 Ellie Goulding – presented Favorite Female Latin Artist
 Latto – presented Favorite Afrobeats Artist
 Jessie James Decker and  Roselyn Sánchez – presented Favorite Rock Song
 Melissa Etheridge – introduced Pink (for Newton-John tribute)
 Liza Koshy – presented Favorite Hip-Hop Song
 Sabrina Carpenter and Dustin Lynch – presented Favorite Music Video
 Kim Petras – presented Favorite Pop Song
 Dan + Shay – presented Artist of the Year
 Smokey Robinson – introduced Richie (for the Icon Award presentation)

Winners and nominees
Nominees were selected from among the most popular artists and music releases within the period dated September 24, 2021, through September 22, 2022. Nominations were released the following month, on October 13, with Becky G announcing the contenders for New Artist of the Year on Good Morning America. Nominees for all other categories were shared via the AMAs Twitter account. Bad Bunny received the most nominations of any artist with eight, including his first for Artist of the Year. Taylor Swift earned a record-extending ninth nomination in the same category, which comprised seven nominees this year, marking the highest count the category has seen in comparison to the previous five ceremonies where only five nominees were chosen each time. Swift, Beyoncé, and Drake received six nominations apiece, with the first two being the most-nominated female artists. Imagine Dragons and Måneskin tied for the most group nominations with four each. Over 40 artists were first-time nominees, including Anitta, Jack Harlow, Latto, and Tems. Elton John received two nominations, for Collaboration of the Year and Favourite Touring Artist, setting the record as the longest-recognized artist in AMA history to date—he was first nominated at the inaugural ceremony in 1974.

Voting in all categories, except Favorite K-pop Artist, opened the same day nominations were announced and took place on the AMAs website and Twitter. Four new categories were added this year: Favorite Afrobeats and K-pop Artist respectively, Favorite Rock Song, and Favorite Rock Album. The awards for Favorite Soundtrack and Favorite Touring Artist were restored to the roster following the reopening of theatres and resumption of touring after pandemic restrictions lifted earlier in the year. Favorite Trending Song was removed. Voting for Favorite K-pop Artist began on November 1 and took place on the aforementioned platforms, as well as on the newly launched AMAs Discord server. It is the only category for which voting continued through show day—all other categories closed on November 14—ending an hour into the ceremony.

Winners for 25 non-televised awards were announced prior to showtime, through a Twitter and Discord audio livestream hosted by Tetris Kelly of Billboard, Tiffany Taylor of The Hollywood Reporter, and K-pop singer Mark Tuan. The rest were revealed during the live television broadcast. Swift went on to become the most-awarded artist of the night, winning all six of her nominations, including Artist of the Year. She extended her record as the most-decorated artist in the history of the ceremony with 40 wins overall. John won his nomination for Collaboration of the Year, marking his first win since 1988. A new award, Song of Soul, which "spotlights an emerging, mission-driven artist who has inspired change and invoked social justice through their lyrics", was presented to Yola for her song "Break the Bough", from the Elvis soundtrack. Lionel Richie was presented with the Icon Award.

Winners are listed first and highlighted in bold.

References 

2022 awards in the United States
2022 in Los Angeles
2022 in American music
2022 music awards
American Music Awards
 November 2022 events in the United States